Acacia minutifolia, commonly known as the small-leaved flying-saucer bush, is a shrub of the genus Acacia and the subgenus Plurinerves that is endemic to arid areas of north western Australia.

Description
The bark is more or less smooth but can longitudinally fissured with age and is usually a pale grey-brown colour. The scaly and leprous branchlets are angled to ward the apices and have yellow to red-brown upper portions. Like most species of Acacia it has phyllodes rather than true leaves.

Taxonomy
The species was first formally described by the botanist Ferdinand von Mueller in 1874 as a part of work Fragmenta Phytographiae Australiae. It was reclassified as Racosperma minutifolium by Leslie Pedley in 2003 then transferred back to genus Acacia in 2006.

Distribution
It is native to an area in the Northern Territory and the north eastern Goldfields-Esperance, eastern Pilbara and south eastern Kimberley regions of Western Australia where it is found growing in rocky soils. In the Northern Territory it is found in western areas including the Great Sandy Desert, MacDonnell Ranges, Tanami Desert and Central Ranges where it is usually situated on gravelly or rocky ranges composed of acidic or acidic rocks or upon stony laterite rises and sometimes on sandplains.

See also
List of Acacia species

References

minutifolia
Acacias of Western Australia
Flora of the Northern Territory
Taxa named by Ferdinand von Mueller
Plants described in 1874